47 Dhansukh Bhawan is a 2019 one shot  Gujarati  thriller film written, directed and edited by Naiteek Ravval, produced by Naiteek Ravval himself and Rishi Vyas under banner of Gallops Tallkies. The film starring Shyam Nair, Rishi Vyas, Gaurav Paswala, Jay Bhatt and Hemang Vyas, revolves around an old house where mysterious things are happening.  The film was released nationwide by Rupam Entertainment Pvt Ltd, on 26 July 2019.

Cast 
 Gaurav Paswala as Dhaval 
 Rishi Vyas as Rishi
 Shyam Nair as Shyam 
 Jay Bhatt as Balwant Bhai
 Hemang Vyas as Nayan

Production
47 Dhansukh Bhawan is the first Gujarati one shot film. Which shoot in single shot without any cut.   Music of the film is given by Shuchita Vyas and Sung by Bhoomi Trivedi . Zee Music Company is the official music label of the film

Development
The film was shot in Surat under the production of Gallops Tallkies. The first official poster of the film is released on 15 June 2019  and Teaser got released on 17 June 2019

Release
The trailer of the film was released on 23 June 2019.
The film was released on 26 July 2019.

Soundtrack

The music of the film is composed by Shuchita Vyas and lyrics are by Jay Bhatt.

References

External links
 

2019 films
Films shot in Gujarat
Indian thriller films
2010s Gujarati-language films
2019 thriller films